Have a Bleedin Guess is a 2019 book written by the English rock drummer and writer Paul Hanley on the recording of The Fall's Hex Enduction Hour. It was published by Route Publishing in October 2019. Hanley was the drummer in the Fall from 1980 to 1985, and he is one of the two drummers featured on the album.

Content
The book outlines the circumstances surrounding the recording of The Fall's 1982 album Hex Enduction Hour, including details of its recording sessions and the live dates that immediately preceded and followed it. It details the album's reception and subsequent cultural impact. There is also a discussion of the influence Wyndham Lewis and Blast had on the group's singer Mark E. Smith, and subsequently the album itself. The book features interviews with several of those involved in the album's creation and release, including producers Richard Mazda and Grant Showbiz, and band members Craig Scanlon, Marc Riley and Steve Hanley .

Reception
Writing in The Dublin Review of Books John Fleming concluded that the book "could be profitably patented as a pragmatic template for art memoirs or biographies", and Record Collector called it 'witty, scrupulously objective and rich in the microscopic detail all dedicated Fall fans crave'.  Writing in The Australian Gideon Haigh named it his book of the year.

References

Sources
Hanley, Paul. Have a Bleedin Guess: The Story of Hex Enduction Hour. London: Route, 2019.

External links
 Paul Hanley in Conversation at Library Lounge, Central library
 Playlist to accompany the book

2019 non-fiction books
Music in Manchester
Culture in Manchester